Aglaonice or Aganice of Thessaly (Aglaoníkē, compound of αγλαὸς (aglaòs) "luminous" and νίκη (nikē) "victory") was a Greek astronomer and thaumaturge of the 2nd or 1st century BC. She is mentioned in the writings of Plutarch and in the scholia to Apollonius of Rhodes as a female astronomer and as the daughter of Hegetor (or Hegemon) of Thessaly. She was regarded as a sorceress for (amongst other extraordinary feats) her (self-proclaimed) ability to 'make the moon disappear from the sky' (καθαιρεῖν τὴν σελήνην : kathaireĩn tìn selénen) which has been taken – first by Plutarch and subsequently by modern astronomers – to mean that she could predict the time and general area where a lunar eclipse would occur.

A Greek proverb makes reference to Aglaonice's alleged boasting: "Yes, as the Moon obeys Aglaonice". A number of female astrologers, apparently regarded as sorcerers, were associated with Aglaonice. They were known as the "witches of Thessaly" and were active from the 3rd to 1st centuries BCE.

In Plato's Gorgias, Socrates speaks of "the Thessalian enchantresses, who, as they say, bring down the moon from heaven at the risk of their own perdition."

Plutarch wrote that she was "thoroughly acquainted with the periods of the full moon when it is subject to eclipse, and, knowing beforehand the time when the moon was due to be overtaken by the earth's shadow, imposed upon the women, and made them all believe that she was drawing down the moon." 

In the majority of lunar eclipses with which we are now familiar the moon does not seem completely to disappear – merely changing colour and assuming a tawny or coppery shade – yet in the descriptions of Aglaonice's eclipses there is no reference to any failures in which the moon was 'partially consumed' – rather the moon was 'completely devoured'. As Bicknell points out, had Aglaonice made her extravagant claim on occasions when the moon still remained partly visible, she would have excited in her (admittedly credulous) audience nothing but ridicule. Bicknell is extremely cautious in offering what is nonetheless a plausible explanation. He notes that, while an increase in particulate matter in the atmosphere as a result of major volcanic eruptions can result in short-term anomalous darkening of lunar eclipses, the dominant factor in regular, cyclical darkening is a combination of the influence of the 11-year solar cycle discovered by Danjon and expressed in the Danjon scale and 'long-term excursions (cycles) of solar activity'  measurable over millennia. Study of the second (greater) cycle undertaken by J. A. Eddy reveals a 'Roman maximum', contributing to unusually dark lunar eclipses (Danjon number: 0) in the last two centuries before the Christian era – encompassing both the temporal 'window' during which Aglaonice could  have been active and the time at which Plutarch wrote his accounts of her seeming sorcery.

Cultural influence
Practitioners of the Wiccan religion reference indirectly the feats of Aglaonice in their ritual entitled Drawing down the Moon, whereby a priestess invokes the Triple Goddess. They claim that the source for this ritual is to be found in the body of lore entitled Vangelo recorded in Leland's Aradia.
And thus it came to pass one night, at the meeting of all the sorceresses and fairies, she (Aradia/Herodias) declared that she would darken the heavens and turn all the mice into stars 

The phrase was also used as part of the title of the influential Wiccan text Drawing Down the Moon: Witches, Druids, Goddess-Worshippers, and Other Pagans in America Today by Wiccan priestess Margot Adler published in 1979.

One of the craters on Venus is named after Aglaonice. She is a character in the Jean Cocteau film Orpheus, where she is a friend of Eurydice and leader of the League of Women. Aglaonice is a featured figure on Judy Chicago's installation piece The Dinner Party, being represented as one of the 999 names on the Heritage Floor.

See also
Timeline of women in science

References

 

Women astronomers
Ancient Greek astronomers
Ancient Thessalian women
2nd-century BC Greek people
2nd-century BC Greek women
Hellenistic Thessalians
Ancient women scientists